Paul Maasland (17 December 1903 – 15 September 1983) was a Dutch rower. He competed at the 1924 and 1928 Summer Olympics in the men's eight and coxless four, respectively, but failed to reach the finals.

References

1903 births
1983 deaths
Dutch male rowers
Olympic rowers of the Netherlands
Rowers at the 1924 Summer Olympics
Rowers at the 1928 Summer Olympics
Sportspeople from The Hague
European Rowing Championships medalists
20th-century Dutch people